Tiger Army II: Power of Moonlite is Tiger Army's second album, released on July 24, 2001. It featured London May on drums, Geoff Kresge on stand up bass and Nick 13 on vocals and guitar. London May left the band before their next album, Tiger Army III: Ghost Tigers Rise (he was replaced with Fred Hell). This album in particular features songs that are laced with rockabilly overtones (such as "Cupid's Victim"), though the band is considered psychobilly.

"Annabel Lee" references the popular poem of the same title by Edgar Allan Poe. Some songs, including "Under Saturn's Shadow" and "Annabel Lee," are backed with vocals by Davey Havok of AFI.

Track listing
All songs written and composed by Nick 13

Personnel

Tiger Army
 Nick 13 – guitar, lead vocals, mixing
 Geoff Kresge – double bass, vocals
 London May – drums

Guest musicians
 Lars Frederiksen – additional vocals on "Power of Moonlite" and "Towards Destiny", slide guitar on "Power of Moonlite"
 Matt Freeman – additional vocals on "Power of Moonlite" and "Towards Destiny"
 Davey Havok – additional vocals on "Power of Moonlite", "Annabel Lee", "Grey Dawn Breaking", and "Under Saturn's Shadow"
 Greg Leisz – steel guitar on "In the Orchard"

Other personnel
 Andrew Alekel – audio engineer
 Mike Cornwall – guitar technician
 Andy Ernst – mixing
 Mike Fasano – drum technician
 Gene Grimaldi – mastering

References

Tiger Army albums
2001 albums
Hellcat Records albums